Iván Alemany (born 30 April 1967) is a Spanish former cyclist. He competed in the road race at the 1988 Summer Olympics.

References

External links
 

1967 births
Living people
Spanish male cyclists
Olympic cyclists of Spain
Cyclists at the 1988 Summer Olympics
People from Ribera Alta (comarca)
Sportspeople from the Province of Valencia
Cyclists from the Valencian Community